Apsey may refer to:

People
Len Apsey (1910–1967), Welsh professional association football player
Apsey, a variant of the Russian male first name Avsey

Places
Apsey Beach, fishing settlement in the Canadian province of Newfoundland and Labrador
Apsey Brook, settlement on Random Island in Trinity Bay, Newfoundland and Labrador
Apsey Cove, formerly Apsey Cove Point, Newfoundland and Labrador
Apsey Green, village in Suffolk, England
Apsey Point, farming and fishing settlement in the Trinity District, Newfoundland and Labrador

See also

Haapse, village in Estonia
Apse (disambiguation)